The Rue des Archives is a street in The Marais at the border of 3rd and 4th arrondissements of Paris, France.

Location and access
The street is located in Le Marais district of central Paris. It is served by the metro stations Hôtel de Ville and Rambuteau.

Origin of the name
This street owes its name to the fact that it runs alongside the Archives Nationales (National Archives) of France.

History

The enclosure of Philippe Auguste initially cut off the street at No 54 before a gate, the Porte du Chaume, was created at the end of the 13th century.

The Rue du Chaume, Rue du Grand Chantier, and Rue des Enfants Rouges were opened at the end of the 13th century as the main road for the subdivision of the Ville-Neuve du Temple created by the order of the Templars and once formed the Rue Neuve-du-Temple.

On 23 May 1863, a decree declares the alignment of streets Rue des Billettes, Rue de l'Homme-Armé, Rue du Chaume, Rue du Grand-Chantier, Rue des Enfants-Rouges, and Rue Molay. These were designed to form a single axis crossing Le Marais.

In 1874, the Rue des Archives was created by the merger of:

 the part of Rue du Chaume between the Rambuteau and Haudriettes streets;
 the Rue du Grand-Chantier, between the streets of Haudriettes and Pastourelle;
 the Rue des Enfants-Rouges, between the streets Pastourelle and Portefoin;
 the Rue Molay, between the streets Portefoin and Perrée.

In 1890, the street was extended between Rue Rambuteau and Rue de Rivoli by the absorption of:

 the Rue des Deux-Portes-Saint-Jean, between Rue de Rivoli and Rue de la Verrerie;
 the Rue des Billettes, between Rue de la Verrerie and Rue Sainte-Croix-de-la-Bretonnerie;
 the Rue de l'Homme-Armé, between Rue Sainte-Croix-de-la-Bretonnerie and Rue des Blancs-Manteaux;
 the part of Rue du Chaume between Rue des Blancs-Manteaux and Rue Rambuteau.

Before 1910, the Rue des Archives ended at the Rue Dupetit-Thouars. At that time, the name of Rue Eugène-Spuller was given to the part of Rue des Archives between Rue de Bretagne and Rue Dupetit-Thouars.

In 2019, three sections of Rue des Archives were officially named (from north to south):

 Place Patrice-Chéreau (3rd arrondissement): place at the level of Fontaine des Haudriettes, Rue des Haudriettes;
 Place Ovida-Delect (4th arrondissement): place located at the crossroads of Rue des Blancs-Manteaux;
 Place Harvey-Milk, (4th arrondissement): crossroads of Rue des Archives and Rue de la Verrerie.

Buildings and structures
The plans decided in 1863 were not fully implemented and historical buildings have therefore been preserved:
th
 Nos 22 to 26: eastern part of Rue des Billettes with mainly the Church of Les Billettes, with the oldest medieval cloister still existing in its original form in Paris. On this part, the constructions of only the odd side were destroyed and replaced by aligned Haussmannian buildings while the opposite bank has retained its old irregular layout.

 No 34: Building whose 1st and 2nd floors were occupied from 1965 to 1980 by a specialized school for hearing impaired people: Le Collège et Lycée Privés Morvan (Le Cours Morvan) now at No 68 Rue de la Chaussée d'Antin, 75009 Paris.
 No 40: House known as “Jacques Coeur” because it was owned by one of his descendants, nursery school, Rue de l'Homme-Armé.
 No 45: Former convent of the Fathers of the Merci; there are two wall sundials inside the courtyard, only one visible from the street.
On the part along the former convent, the street has retained its original width.

 No 53: a dummy facade hides a transformer of Électricité de France (EDF).
 No 54: location of the old postern, called Postern du Chaume, opened in 1288 in the enclosure of Philippe Auguste.

 Northeast corner of the intersection of Rue des Archives and Rue des Francs-Bourgeois: remains of a fountain transformed into a viewing window during the reconstruction of the Hôtel de Soubise, then remodelled in 1959 after creating of a doorway. A plate indicates the sea level measured in the basin of the port of Marseille, as well as its difference with the zero level of Pont de la Tournelle.

 No 58: Hôtel de Soubise (housing the Musée des Archives Nationales, part of the Archives Nationales) and fountain of Haudriettes, Rue du Chaume.
 
 No 60: Hôtel de Guénégaud or "Hôtel de l'Hermitage".
 No 62: Hôtel de Mongelas, Musée de la Chasse et de la Nature (Museum of Hunting and Nature).
 No 68: Hôtel de Refuge.
 No 70: Hôtel Montescot.
 No 72: Hôtel de Villeflix.
 No 74: Hôtel de Tallemant (or Chailloux de Jonville).
 No 76: Hôtel Le Pelletier de Souzy, Rue du Grand-Chantier.
 No 78: Hôtel de Tallard (or Amelot de Chaillou), Rue des Enfants-Rouges.
 No 80: location of the Hôpital des Enfants-Rouges which became the barracks of the Enfants-Rouges in 1808.

Further up the street, there are other interesting buildings, notably at Nos 79, 81, 85, and 90.

Literature
In the novel Ferragus: Chief of the Devorants, by Honoré de Balzac, the widow Gruget lives at No 12 in the "Rue des Enfants-Rouges". This is where Jules Desmarets listens to the conversation between his wife (Clémence Desmarets) and Ferragus XXIII.

References

Bibliography

External links
 

1874 establishments in France
Streets in the 3rd arrondissement of Paris
Streets in the 4th arrondissement of Paris
Le Marais